Faraony is a river in Fitovinany, eastern Madagascar. It flows down from the central highlands to the Indian Ocean. It flows thru Manampatrana, Vohimanitra, Mahabako, Sahasinaka, Mahavoky, Vohimasina Nord and empties south of Namorona in the Indian Ocean.

References

Rivers of Madagascar
Rivers of Fitovinany